Joseph and Elizabeth Wallendorf House is a historic home located at Jefferson City, Cole County, Missouri. It was built about 1830, and is a two-story enclosed dogtrot style horizontal log house on a stone foundation. The house was moved to its present location in 2004 and restored in 2005.

It was listed on the National Register of Historic Places in 2008.

References

Log houses
Houses on the National Register of Historic Places in Missouri
Houses completed in 1830
Buildings and structures in Jefferson City, Missouri
National Register of Historic Places in Cole County, Missouri